There have been several racing games in the Mario franchise.

Mario Kart series

F1 series

Other titles

See also
 List of Mario sports games

 
Mario racing
Mario racing games
Video games developed in Japan